Yaroslav Mikhaylovich Blanter (born 19 November 1967) is a Russian physicist, an expert in the field of extractive metallurgy and condensed matter physics. As of 2011, he is the Antoni van Leeuwenhoek professor at the Delft University of Technology.

Biography
Blanter was born in Moscow. In 1984, he graduated from the Second physico-mathematical school of Moscow.

In 1990, he graduated from the physicochemical department of the Moscow Institute of Steel and Alloys in the field of extractive metallurgy.

Until 1992, he took post-graduate courses at the same institute. In 1992, he defended his thesis and received the Candidate of physico-mathematical sciences degree. The subject of the thesis concerned the development of the quantum effects in the kinetic properties of the electronic systems at the topological transition.

From 1990 to 1994, he taught statistical physics, the theory of normal and superconducting metals, classical and quantum mechanics. From 1989 to 1993, he also taught mathematics at the 43rd School of Moscow.

In 1995, supported by the Alexander von Humboldt Foundation, he obtained a position at the Institute of Condensed Matter Theory in Karlsruhe. From 1996 to 2000, he held a position at the University of Geneva. From 2000 to 2007, he was an associate professor at the Delft University of Technology. In 2007, he became a senior associate professor there. In 2002, he was one of three members of the organizing committee of the NATO Advanced Research Workshop "Quantum Noise in Mesoscopic Physics", held in Delft, the Netherlands.

From 2007 to 2011, he was an active contributor with administrator permissions in the Russian Wikipedia and a member of the Arbitration Committee. The Daily Dot noted Blanter's role in the deletion of an English Wikipedia hoax previously listed for almost four years.

Selected works 
Blanter has published over 100 works in several scientific journals. His h-index is 22. The works that are most often referred to are listed below.

See also
 List of Wikipedia people

Books
 Nazarov, Yuli V.; Blanter, Yaroslav M.; Quantum Transport: Introduction to Nanoscience, Cambridge University Press, 2009. .

References

1967 births
Living people
Academic staff of the Delft University of Technology
National University of Science and Technology MISiS alumni
Scientists from Moscow
Russian physicists
Russian Wikimedians
Russian emigrants to the Netherlands
Wikipedia people